Lesley Ann Manville  (born 12 March 1956) is an English actress known for her frequent collaborations with Mike Leigh, appearing in the films Grown-Ups (1980), High Hopes (1988), Secrets & Lies (1996), Topsy-Turvy (1999), All or Nothing (2002), Vera Drake (2004), Another Year (2010), and Mr. Turner (2014). She has been nominated for two British Academy Film Award for Best Supporting Actress for her roles in Another Year (2010) and Phantom Thread (2017); with the latter earning her a nomination for the Academy Award for Best Supporting Actress.

Manville has also appeared in the films Dance with a Stranger (1985), A Christmas Carol (2009), Maleficent (2014), Maleficent: Mistress of Evil (2019), Let Him Go (2020), and Mrs. Harris Goes to Paris (2022), as well as the television series Emmerdale (1974–1976), Cranford (2007), Fleming: The Man Who Would Be Bond (2014), River (2015), and Mum (2016–2019). She has been nominated for three British Academy Television Awards for the lattermost. A three-time Laurence Olivier Award nominee, she has won once for her role in the 2013–2014 revival of the play Ghosts. She portrays Princess Margaret, Countess of Snowdon in the final two seasons of the television series The Crown.

Early life
Manville was born in Brighton, East Sussex, the daughter of Jean, a former ballet dancer, and Ron Manville, a taxi driver. She was brought up in nearby Hove, the youngest of three daughters. Training as a soprano singer from age 8, she was twice under-18 champion of Sussex. She began acting as a teenager, appearing in television series such as King Cinder. At age 15, she gained a place at the Italia Conti Academy of Theatre Arts.

Career
After turning down teacher Arlene Phillips's invitation to join her new dance troupe Hot Gossip, she was taught improvisation by Italia Conti teacher Julia Carey. She made her professional stage debut in the 1972 West End  musical I and Albert directed by John Schlesinger and paid for her first flat by taking a part in the ITV soap opera Emmerdale Farm (1974–76), appearing in 80 episodes.

Manville built a career as a distinctive theatre actress, appearing in new plays at the Royal Shakespeare Company's Warehouse and Royal Court Theatre from 1978. She met Mike Leigh in 1979, when he was looking for RSC actors who could improvise. In the 1980s, her work for the Royal Court included Andrea Dunbar's Rita, Sue and Bob Too (1981) and Caryl Churchill's Top Girls (1982) and Serious Money (1987). She also starred in the Top Girls Off-Broadway production in 1983. For the RSC, she starred in As You Like It (1985) and Les Liaisons Dangereuses (1985–86). She made her film debut in 1985s Dance with a Stranger directed by Mike Newell, and went on to appear in Sammy and Rosie Get Laid (1987) directed by Stephen Frears, and High Season (1987). Back on the stage, she starred in The Cherry Orchard at the Aldwych Theatre in 1989, directed by Sam Mendes, and in Three Sisters at the Royal Court in 1990.

In 1994, Manville starred in the first series of the BBC sitcom Ain't Misbehavin'. For her work in the 2000 miniseries Other People's Children, and the 2002 TV film Bodily Harm, she received nominations for Best Female Actor at the Royal Television Society Awards. Her extensive television credits include prominent roles in the dramas Holding On (1997), Real Women (1998–99), The Cazalets (2001), North & South (2004) and Cranford (2007). She also starred in Cards on the Table, a 2006 feature-length episode of Agatha Christie's Poirot.

Since 2005, Manville has starred in several National Theatre productions, including His Dark Materials (2005), The Alchemist (2006) and Her Naked Skin (2008). She also starred in The Old Vic productions of All About My Mother (2007) and Six Degrees of Separation (2010). In 2009, she played Margaret Thatcher in the Channel 4 drama The Queen.

Manville has appeared in numerous Mike Leigh films throughout her career, including High Hopes (1988), Secrets & Lies (1996), Topsy-Turvy (1999), Vera Drake (2004) and Mr. Turner (2014). Her most notable Mike Leigh films are All or Nothing in 2002 and Another Year in 2010. For both, she won the London Film Critics Circle Award for British Actress of the Year. For Another Year, she also won the National Board of Review Award for Best Actress, and was nominated for the British Independent Film Award for Best Supporting Actress and the European Film Award for Best Actress, as well as the Chicago Film Critics Award for Best Actress. She also won  Best Supporting Actress from the San Diego Film Critics Society. On 18 January 2011, she received a BAFTA nomination in the Best Supporting Actress category. On 7 February 2011, former Charlie's Angels stars Jaclyn Smith and Cheryl Ladd presented the Best Actress Award to her at the "Movies for Grownups Awards".

In 2011, Manville starred in Mike Leigh's play Grief at the National Theatre which earned her a Best Actress Olivier Award nomination. For her role as Helene Alving in the 2013 revival of the Ibsen play Ghosts, she won the 2014 Olivier Award for Best Actress and the Critics' Circle Theatre Award for Best Actress. She also appeared in the films Romeo and Juliet (2013) and Maleficent (2014).

In 2015, she starred opposite Stellan Skarsgård in the BBC drama River, which earned her a nomination for the 2016 BAFTA TV Award for Best Supporting Actress. She then starred opposite Peter Mullan in the BBC sitcom Mum, for which she was nominated for the BAFTA TV Award for Best Female Comedy Performance in 2017 and 2019.

In the 2017 period film Phantom Thread, Manville played Cyril Woodcock, the sister of the dressmaker Reynolds Woodcock, played by Daniel Day-Lewis. For her role, she was nominated for the Academy Award and BAFTA for Best Supporting Actress. In 2020, she played the villainous and intimidating matriarch of an 'off the grid' family in the neo-western thriller Let Him Go opposite Diane Lane and Kevin Costner.

Manville was appointed Commander of the Order of the British Empire (CBE) in the 2021 New Year Honours for services to drama and charity.

In 2022, Manville starred in the Anthony Horowitz murder mystery series, Magpie Murders, alongside Daniel Mays, Alexandros Logothetis, Jude Hill, and Claire Rushbrook. Manville also played the role of the titular character in Mrs. Harris Goes to Paris. She received a nomination for the Golden Globe Award for Best Actress in a Motion Picture – Comedy or Musical for her performance in this film.

In January 2023, it was announced that Manville was added to the cast of the Amy Winehouse biopic Back to Black and would be playing Winehouse's grandmother Cynthia Winehouse.

Personal life
Manville's first boyfriend was actor Peter Duncan whom she met at stage school while attending Italia Conti.

Her first husband was actor Gary Oldman. The pair split in 1989, three months after their son, Alfie (born 1988), was born. Her second marriage was to actor Joe Dixon.

In 2007, Manville was living with her son in East Grinstead, West Sussex.

In 2020, she delivered a monologue for the Equity Benevolent Fund to support fellow actors during the COVID-19 pandemic.

Manville was appointed Officer of the Order of the British Empire (OBE) in the 2015 Birthday Honours for services to drama, and promoted to Commander of the Order of the British Empire (CBE) in the 2021 New Year Honours for services to drama and charity.

Filmography

Film

Television

Theatre

Awards and nominations

References

External links
 
 Interview with The Independent, 2010

1956 births
20th-century English actresses
21st-century English actresses
Actresses from Brighton
Actresses from Sussex
Alumni of the Italia Conti Academy of Theatre Arts
Commanders of the Order of the British Empire
English film actresses
English radio actresses
English Shakespearean actresses
English soap opera actresses
English stage actresses
English television actresses
Laurence Olivier Award winners
Living people
People from East Grinstead
People from Hove
Royal Shakespeare Company members